Al Majalla (Arabic: The Journal) was an Arabic language cultural magazine headquartered in Cairo, Egypt. The magazine was started by the Ministry of Culture in 1957 and published until 1971. Its subtitle was Sijil al-Thaqafa al-Rai‘a (Arabic: a Record of High Culture).

History and profile
Al Majalla was launched by the Ministry of Culture in 1957 when the ministry was also established. The founding editor was Mohamed Awad. The magazine became a popular publication shortly after its start. Tharwat Okasha, the minister of culture, appointed Yahya Haqqi, a well-known writer, editor-in-chief of the magazine in 1962. Haqqi modified the function of the magazine from being an official organ of the ministry to being a platform for younger generation of the Egyptian writers and cultural figures. In 1971 Haqqi was removed from the editorship, and Al Majalla was closed down by a decree of the President Anwar Sadat which was described by Mohammed Saad of Ahram Online as the massacre of the magazines.

In 2012 a cultural magazine with the same name was established in Cairo.

References
 

1957 establishments in Egypt
1971 disestablishments in Egypt
Arabic-language magazines
Censorship in Egypt
Defunct literary magazines published in Egypt
Magazines established in 1957
Magazines disestablished in 1971
Magazines published in Cairo
Banned magazines